Colin Keiver  (born July 22, 1968) is a Royal Canadian Air Force major general who is currently the deputy commander of the Royal Canadian Air Force.

Early life and education
Keiver was born on July 22, 1968, and raised on a farm outside of Three Hills, Alberta. From a young age, he had a keen interest in aviation where he received his glider pilot licence through air cadets at the age of 16 in Gimli, Manitoba. He holds a Bachelor of Arts degree in political science from the University of Manitoba, a master's degree in defence studies from the Royal Military College of Canada and is a graduate of the Royal College of Defence Studies in London, UK.

Military career

Born in Three Hills, Alberta, Keiver joined the Canadian Armed Forces in 1991. Progressing from primary flying training on the Beechcraft CT-134 Musketeer at CFB Portage la Prairie to completing basic flying training on the Canadair CT-114 Tutor at CFB Moose Jaw, he went on to multi-engine training returning to CFB Portage la Prairie where he trained on the Beechcraft King Air before transitioning to flying the CC-130 in 435 Transport and Rescue Squadron in 1994.  In 2001, he had been sent on exchange with the United States Marine Corps to fly KC-130's in VMGR-252 as the Director of Safety and Standardization. In February 2002, while on exchange with the United States Marine Corps, he had been deployed to Afghanistan for 3 months to play a part in Operation Enduring Freedom.

In 2004, Keiver returned to Canada to Winnipeg, Manitoba, as A3 Transport Operations at 1 Canadian Air Division Headquarters.  During his time at the 1 Canadian Air Division Headquarters, he was deployed to Sudan as the Air Operations Advisor for the African Union Mission in Sudan from late November 2005, to late May 2006. Upon his return to 1 Canadian Air Division Headquarters as A3 Transport where he had played a vital role in introducing both the CC-177 and the CC-130J to service.

In 2009, he attended the Canadian Forces College in Toronto, Ontario, where he obtained a master's degree in defence studies. Transitioning from the Canadian Forces College to flying the CC-130J in 436 Transport Squadron when it was delivered in June 2010 as the squadron commander, Keiver has had lots of experience in command roles at CFB Trenton from being the 27th commander of 436 Squadron to becoming the 49th Wing Commander of 8 Wing Trenton in the summer of 2015 until the summer of 2017. Throughout his time between being the commander of 436 Transport Squadron and the commander of 8 Wing Trenton, he had been in Ottawa as the Director Air Simulation and Training and had attended the Royal College of Defence Studies in London, United Kingdom. After finishing his time in Trenton, he was appointed Director Defence Program Coordination in the National Defence Headquarters of Canada for a year. He was appointed the commander of JTF-I in the summer of 2018. As of July 2019, he has been the Director General of Air and Space Force Development. In April, 2021, he was promoted to the rank of major general to be appointed the deputy commander of the Royal Canadian Air Force.

Honours and decorations

Keiver has earned the following decorations throughout his military career.

92px

92px

92px

Timeline of ranks

Notelist

References

|-

|-

|-

|-

1968 births
Living people
Canadian military personnel from Alberta
Graduates of the Royal College of Defence Studies
Canadian generals
Major generals
Canadian military personnel of the War in Afghanistan (2001–2021)
University of Manitoba alumni
Royal Military College of Canada alumni
People from Kneehill County
Canadian Air Force personnel
Royal Canadian Air Force officers
Royal Canadian Air Force generals
United States Marine Corps officers